is a shōnen manga by Hiro Mashima. It was serialized in Comic Bom Bom issues from January to March 2006, then a "second stage" ran from June to September 2007. The manga was collected into two tankobon volumes in 2007. Kodansha USA has licensed the series for North American release and published in 2014.

Plot
The tale of Monster Soul takes place in Elvenland, a fictional land that humans and monsters inhabit. The main characters are a group of monsters called the Black Airs. The Black Airs is recorded as the strongest group of the monster forces in the great war between humans and monsters. The first three chapters consist of three stories that do not have a main plot, but the last chapter of the "first stage" reveals a bit of the past. In the "second stage" the Black Airs travel to Hell to help a human boy save his townspeople who are captured by the evil Drei Kommandos.

Characters

Black Airs (闇の翼)
Aki 
The protagonist of the story, he looks like a normal human but his hoodie jacket hides two small horns on his head. He changes to his giant S class werewolf form when overwhelmed with emotions. In the flashback, he is shown to have been weak when he was young and his S class soul was sought after by others. His parents were "killed" by Beluze but their souls returned and they revived when Beluze was defeated. His weakness is that he must sleep after he uses up his soul form.
Tooran 
She has a golem father and a human mother. An unspoken golem law says "when rain falls on the desert where a golem lives, the golem will melt and die there". Her father and tribe died in the rain (her mother's whereabouts unknown). She can transform her body into sand and turn it into a harp shape or use sand in auxiliary roles like forming smoke screens. She claims to be the idol of the Monster World.
James 
An android type monster resembling Frankenstein's creature, he has weapons hidden all over his body, a monster sensor built in his eyes, flight capability, shooting fists and he can change into an armored knight form which Mummy calls "James Striker System". It is revealed that he is actually a robot developed to hunt monsters, however upon meeting with a younger Mummy a strong relationship developed between the two. His face falls off very often and he is usually seen searching for it.
Mummy 
The blond-haired big sister of the group, she wears bandages in a fashionable way and controls them freely, such as for attacking and dressing wounds. She carries a giant injection needle containing healing liquid. The group is very close to her. In her younger days she came across James in a lab while escaping from her pursuers. She helped the depressed and then nameless James find a purpose in life. The four have been together since their youth and there was an event where Mummy saved Aki by giving her right eye in exchange for Aki's soul. However, she has recovered that eye by the end of the "first stage"; most likely because Aki retrieved it from the monster that took it. She often worries for Aki. She is a hellion but she prefers it be kept a secret. She has a tendency to start stripping for no apparent reason.
Joba 
A small monster with an onion-shaped head and a rare species highly sought after by hunters. Usually its only words is "kpwee".

First Stage characters
Vulcan Brothers 
Two poachers who failed in capturing Joba and later Tooran.
Kiyo 
An elderly female fairy that the Black Airs encountered in the forest. Part of Bacon's rebellion group.
Bacon 
The leader of a rebellion against humans. Brainwashed the monsters in the forest to join him. His parents were killed in the war by humans.
Jenny 
A young fairy girl standing against Bacon's rebellion, she is Kiyo's daughter.
Garuelf 
A three-headed monster who wants the S class soul of Aki. In the past, Mummy managed to ward them off by giving them the soul of her right eye. They came for Aki again but were defeated by Aki.

Second Stage characters
Selsh
A boy from Driochram. This town came under attack by the Drei Kommandos and its people were captured. Selsh escaped hoping to find a hero to save them. He was found unconscious by a river bank by the Black Airs. He was frightened at first but the Black Airs became the hero he was searching for. In the last chapter of Second Stage, Selsh is revealed to be the prince of Driochram.
Pooch
The three-headed monster guarding Hell's Gate.
Jobo
A soldier under the Drei Kommandos.

Drei Kommandos (三鬼游)
Kiriko
A female vampire. Main attack is Evil Cross from her palm. The lips tattoo on her throat can extend and become a fanged mouth to attack and suck blood.
Blank
Leader of the three. He captures humans by sucking them into jars, thus collecting souls which are fed to an egg back at their hideout. An agile fighter, able to shoot dynamite sticks from the two holes on his head. Uses the word "Explosive!" frequently in his speech.
Guyna
A bulky being made of rocks. Able to disintegrate into rocks to attack and bind his opponents. His face falls off like James'.
Beluze
The product of the egg the Drei Kommandos were hatching. It also ate all of the Drei Kommandos. A huge black wolf monster which looks similar to Aki's soul form. His first word is Aki's name. In the last chapter of Second Stage, Beluze is revealed to be a figure from Aki's past. Beluze was once a human Soul hunter and he took the souls of Aki's parents. He used the monster souls he collected and performed the secret technique of racial transformation that turned him into an egg form. With the souls the Drei Kommandos collected Soul Eater Beluze emerged from the egg.

Volume list

References

External links

Shōnen manga
Hiro Mashima
Kodansha manga